Natalya Galushko (born 18 September 1971) is a Belarusian long-distance runner. She competed in the women's marathon at the 1996 Summer Olympics. She won the women's race at the Istanbul Marathon in 1998.

References

External links
 

1971 births
Living people
Athletes (track and field) at the 1996 Summer Olympics
Belarusian female long-distance runners
Belarusian female marathon runners
Olympic athletes of Belarus
Place of birth missing (living people)